Qué Pasa (from the Spanish, what's up?) is a Spanish-language newspaper circulated in North Carolina, USA.  Its primary audience is the Latino community in the state.  The paper maintains distinct editions for the Piedmont, Charlotte, and Research Triangle areas of the state.  This free paper is distributed mostly at restaurant and grocery locations.

External links

References

Spanish-language newspapers published in the United States
Weekly newspapers published in North Carolina
Spanish-language mass media in North Carolina
Non-English-language newspapers published in North Carolina